The 1992 Denmark Open in badminton was a three-star tournament held in Odense, from October 14 to October 18, 1992.

Final results

References

Denmark Open
Denmark